Monteith is a small village in County Down, Northern Ireland. In the 2001 Census it had a population of 126 people. It lies within the Banbridge District area.

References 

NI Neighbourhood Information System

See also 

List of villages in Northern Ireland
List of towns in Northern Ireland

Villages in County Down